Stockstadt is the name of at least two places in Germany:

Stockstadt am Rhein, in Groß-Gerau district, Hesse
Stockstadt am Main, in Aschaffenburg district, Bavaria